Seletskaya is a rural locality (a village) in Churovskoye Rural Settlement, Sheksninsky District, Vologda Oblast, Russia. The population was 62 as of 2002.

Geography 
Seletskaya is located 46 km northeast of Sheksna (the district's administrative centre) by road. Fedorovo is the nearest rural locality.

References 

Rural localities in Sheksninsky District